Ormonde (1885–88) is a Shingle Style country house built on the eastern shore of Cazenovia Lake in Cazenovia, New York. It was designed by architect Frank Furness for George R. Preston, a New Orleans banker who settled in Philadelphia, Pennsylvania.

The 9-bedroom "summer cottage" was originally the centerpiece of a 300-acre (121.4 ha) estate, that was expanded to 400 acres (161.8 ha) early in the 20th century. The carriagehouse and other buildings have since been demolished, and the land subdivided, leaving the main house and boathouse on 2.4 acres (1 ha).

The boathouse's design is unusual: a square stone ground floor at lake's edge supporting a circular shingled second floor, ringed by a 360-degree deck. It relates to Furness's Undine Barge Club (1882–83) on Philadelphia's Boathouse Row, and the architect's own summer cottage, Idlewild (c. 1890), in Media, Pennsylvania.

The property was listed on the National Register of Historic Places in 1991. In addition to the main house and boathouse, it includes one non-contributing building.

Ormonde is "architecturally and historically important as an outstanding early example of the type of large mansions constructed chiefly as summer residences by wealthy clients in the late nineteenth and early twentieth centuries near the shores of Cazenovia Lake in central New York."

It followed Cedar Cove (1884), designed by architect George Browne Post, the first "summer cottage" built on the lake. Others included Notleymere, designed by architect Robert W. Gibson; Scrooby, designed by architect Robert S. Stephenson; and Shore Acres, designed by architect Stanford White.

Ormonde is part of the Cazenovia Town Multiple Resource area.

References
 George E. Thomas, Jeffrey A. Cohen, & Michael J. Lewis, Frank Furness: The Complete Works (New York, Princeton Architectural Press, 1996), pp. 242, 251, 295. 

Houses on the National Register of Historic Places in New York (state)
Queen Anne architecture in New York (state)
Colonial Revival architecture in New York (state)
Houses completed in 1888
Shingle Style houses
Houses in Madison County, New York
Frank Furness buildings
National Register of Historic Places in Cazenovia, New York
Shingle Style architecture in New York (state)